Đặng Thị Mỹ Dung (born October 5, 1989), popularly known as Midu, is a Vietnamese actress, model, lecturer and businesswoman. She has been a lecturer in fashion design at Ho Chi Minh City University of Technology (HUTECH) since May 2017.

Midu starred in the martial arts action movie, Blood Letter (directed by Victor Vu), in 2012. In 2016, Midu starred in the comedy romance film, Four Years, Two Men, One Love, with Harry Lu. Midu's most recent film in which she starred in is the fantasy romance film, Nhân Duyên: Người Yêu Tiền Kiếp (2019), with Trịnh Thăng Bình. Midu has appeared on various Vietnamese gameshows, such as Nhanh như chớp, Chọn Ai Đây, and Ca Sĩ Bí Ẩn.

Midu released her first single, "Anh Nghĩ Anh Là Ai?" on December 30, 2019.

Early life
Midu was born in Ho Chi Minh City, Vietnam on October 5, 1989. She went to THCS Lê Văn Tám junior high and THPT Gia Định high school in Bình Thạnh district in Ho Chi Minh City.

Midu won the Hot VTeen award when she was 18 years old in 2007. This was the beginning of her career in the arts.

Film career

Film

Television

Awards

Personal life 
Midu opened her own boutique in Võ Văn Tần street, District 3, Ho Chi Minh City in 2009. At the time, her boutique was named 'Violet Diary'.

In May 2013, Midu graduated with a degree in fashion design from Ho Chi Minh City University of Architecture.

Midu started dating Vietnamese businessman Phan Thành in 2012 and made their relationship public in 2013. After nearly two years of dating, Phan and Midu became engaged. They broke up three months before the wedding after it came out that Phan cheated.

In November 2017, Midu opened 'Zone 87', a dining and shopping complex in Nguyễn Huệ street, District 1, Ho Chi Minh City.

Family 
Her father is a police officer and her mother is a housewife. She has one younger brother, Đặng Trung Hiếu, who was born in 1995. Midu is especially close to her dad, who is very supportive of her.

References

External links 

 
 
 
 
 
 MV Debut Anh Nghĩ Anh Là Ai - Midu, LK on Doligo.net Video

1989 births
Living people
Vietnamese film actresses
People from Ho Chi Minh City
Vietnamese female models
Vietnamese television actresses
21st-century Vietnamese actresses
Vietnamese businesspeople